Octafluorocyclobutane, or perfluorocyclobutane, C4F8, is an organofluorine compound which enjoys several niche applications. Octafluorocyclobutane is a colourless gas and shipped as a liquefied gas. It is the perfluorinated analogue of cyclobutane whereby all C–H bonds are replaced with C–F bonds.

Production
Octafluorocyclobutane is produced by the dimerization of tetrafluoroethylene and the reductive coupling of 1,2-dichloro-1,1,2,2-tetrafluoroethane.

Applications
In the production of semiconductor materials and devices, octafluorocyclobutane serves as a deposition gas and etchant.  It has also been investigated as a refrigerant in specialised applications, as a replacement for ozone depleting chlorofluorocarbon refrigerants. Exploiting its volatility and chemical inertness, octafluorocyclobutane may be found in some aerosolized foods. It is listed by the Codex Alimentarius under number 946 (E946 for EU). It is investigated as a possible replacement for sulfur hexafluoride as a dielectric gas.

References

Appendix
Its critical point is at 115.3 °C and 2.79 MPa.

Perfluoroalkanes
Aerosol propellants
Refrigerants
Dielectric gases
Cyclobutanes